Teague is a city in Freestone County, Texas, United States. The population was 3,384 at the 2020 census.

Settlement
The area was first settled around the time of the Civil War. During the latter half of the nineteenth century, a small community known as "Brewer" grew up at the site. In April 1886, a resident wrote that all they needed was a jeweler and shoemaker. The resident went on to inventory all the businesses they had, such as a good dry goods and grocery store, a blacksmith and wood shop, and a barber. Later in 1886, a gin was to open. The 1895 Rand McNally atlas shows Brewer with a post office and no express office or railroad. Also in 1895, Brewer Baptist Church ministered by A. B. Tedder had 109 members.

The residents incorporated the new town as "Teague" in 1906, named after Betty Teague, the niece of railroad magnate Benjamin Franklin Yoakum, who was building the Trinity and Brazos Valley Railway through the county at the time. Teague also has a 3300-foot-long airport used primarily for recreational use.

Geography

Teague is located in western Freestone County at  (31.627618, –96.283353). U.S. Route 84 passes through the northern side of the city, leading northeast  to Fairfield, the county seat, and northwest  to Mexia. Texas State Highway 179 (Main Street) leads east  to Dew.

Demographics

As of the 2020 United States census, there were 3,384 people, 1,088 households, and 802 families residing in the city.

As of the census of 2000, there were 4,557 people, 1,275 households, and 864 families residing in the city. The population density was 1,325.4 people per square mile (511.5/km2). There were 1,526 housing units at an average density of 443.9 per square mile (171.3/km2). The racial makeup of the city was 65.28% White, 27.67% African American, 0.13% Native American, 0.20% Asian, 0.07% Pacific Islander, 6.03% from other races, and 0.61% from two or more races. Hispanic or Latino of any race were 13.50% of the population.

There were 1,275 households, out of which 32.5% had children under the age of 18 living with them, 49.6% were married couples living together, 14.6% had a female householder with no husband present, and 32.2% were non-families. 29.8% of all households were made up of individuals, and 17.3% had someone living alone who was 65 years of age or older. The average household size was 2.51 and the average family size was 3.11.

In the city, the population was spread out, with 19.9% under the age of 18, 14.6% from 18 to 24, 36.9% from 25 to 44, 15.4% from 45 to 64, and 13.2% who were 65 years of age or older. The median age was 31 years. For every 100 females, there were 166.0 males. For every 100 females age 18 and over, there were 185.0 males.

The median income for a household in the city was $29,485, and the median income for a family was $36,842. Males had a median income of $24,884 versus $18,821 for females. The per capita income for the city was $14,326. About 10.0% of families and 16.3% of the population were below the poverty line, including 22.9% of those under age 18 and 14.5% of those age 65 or over.

Education
The city is served by the Teague Independent School District.

References

External links
City of Teague official website

Cities in Freestone County, Texas
Cities in Texas